Potassium dichromate, is a common inorganic chemical reagent, most commonly used as an oxidizing agent in various laboratory and industrial applications. As with all hexavalent chromium compounds, it is acutely and chronically harmful to health. It is a crystalline ionic solid with a very bright, red-orange color.  The salt is popular in laboratories because it is not deliquescent, in contrast to the more industrially relevant salt sodium dichromate.

Chemistry

Production
Potassium dichromate is usually prepared by the reaction of potassium chloride on sodium dichromate.  Alternatively, it can be also obtained from potassium chromate by roasting chromite ore with potassium hydroxide.  It is soluble in water and in the dissolution process it ionizes:
K2Cr2O7 → 2 K+ + 
 + H2O ⇌ 2  + 2 H+

Reaction
Potassium dichromate is an oxidising agent in organic chemistry, and is milder than potassium permanganate. It is used to oxidize alcohols. It converts primary alcohols into aldehydes and, under more forcing conditions, into carboxylic acids. In contrast, potassium permanganate tends to give carboxylic acids as the sole products. Secondary alcohols are converted into ketones. For example, menthone may be prepared by oxidation of menthol with acidified dichromate. Tertiary alcohols cannot be oxidized.

In an aqueous solution the color change exhibited can be used to test for distinguishing aldehydes from ketones. Aldehydes reduce dichromate from the +6 to the +3 oxidation state, changing color from orange to green. This color change arises because the aldehyde can be oxidized to the corresponding carboxylic acid. A ketone will show no such change because it cannot be oxidized further, and so the solution will remain orange.

When heated strongly, it decomposes with the evolution of oxygen.
4 K2Cr2O7 →  4 K2CrO4 + 2 Cr2O3 + 3 O2

When an alkali is added to an orange-red solution containing dichromate ions, a yellow solution is obtained due to the formation of chromate ions. For example, potassium chromate is produced industrially using potash:
K2Cr2O7  +  K2CO3   →   2 K2CrO4 + CO2
The reaction is reversible.

Treatment with cold sulfuric acid gives red crystals of chromic anhydride (chromium trioxide, CrO3):
 K2Cr2O7  +  2 H2SO4  →   2 CrO3  +  2 KHSO4  +  H2O
On heating with concentrated acid, oxygen is evolved:
2 K2Cr2O7  +  8 H2SO4   →   2 K2SO4  +  2 Cr2(SO4)3  +  8 H2O + 3 O2

Uses
Potassium dichromate has few major applications, as the sodium salt is dominant industrially.  The main use is as a precursor to potassium chrome alum, used in leather tanning.

Cleaning
Like other chromium(VI) compounds (chromium trioxide, sodium dichromate), potassium dichromate has been used to prepare "chromic acid" for cleaning glassware and etching materials.  Because of safety concerns associated with hexavalent chromium, this practice has been largely discontinued.

Construction
It is used as an ingredient in cement in which it retards the setting of the mixture and improves its density and texture.  This usage commonly causes contact dermatitis in construction workers.

Photography and printing
In 1839, Mungo Ponton discovered that paper treated with a solution of potassium dichromate was visibly tanned by exposure to sunlight, the discoloration remaining after the potassium dichromate had been rinsed out. In 1852, Henry Fox Talbot discovered that exposure to ultraviolet light in the presence of potassium dichromate hardened organic colloids such as gelatin and gum arabic, making them less soluble.

These discoveries soon led to the carbon print, gum bichromate, and other photographic printing processes based on differential hardening. Typically, after exposure, the unhardened portion was rinsed away with warm water, leaving a thin relief that either contained a pigment included during manufacture or was subsequently stained with a dye. Some processes depended on the hardening only, in combination with the differential absorption of certain dyes by the hardened or unhardened areas. Because some of these processes allowed the use of highly stable dyes and pigments, such as carbon black, prints with an extremely high degree of archival permanence and resistance to fading from prolonged exposure to light could be produced.

Dichromated colloids were also used as photoresists in various industrial applications, most widely in the creation of metal printing plates for use in photomechanical printing processes.

Chromium intensification or Photochromos uses potassium dichromate together with  equal parts of concentrated hydrochloric acid diluted down to approximately 10% v/v to treat weak and thin negatives of black and white photograph roll. This solution reconverts the elemental silver particles in the film to silver chloride. After thorough washing and exposure to actinic light, the film can be redeveloped to its end-point yielding a stronger negative which is able to produce a more satisfactory print.

A potassium dichromate solution in sulfuric acid can be used to produce a reversal negative (that is, a positive transparency from a negative film). This is effected by  developing a black and white film but allowing the development to proceed more or less to the end point. The development is then stopped by copious washing and the film then treated in the acid dichromate solution. This converts the silver metal to silver sulfate, a compound that is insensitive to light. After thorough washing and exposure to actinic light, the film is developed again allowing the previously unexposed silver halide to be reduced to silver metal.
The results obtained can be unpredictable, but sometimes excellent results are obtained producing images that would otherwise be unobtainable. This process can be coupled with solarisation so that the end product resembles a negative and is suitable for printing in the normal way.

Cr(VI) compounds have the property of tanning animal proteins when exposed to strong light. This quality is used in photographic screen-printing.

In screen-printing a fine screen of bolting silk or similar material is stretched taut onto a frame similar to the way canvas is prepared before painting. A colloid sensitized with a dichromate is applied evenly to the taut screen. Once the dichromate mixture is dry, a full-size photographic positive is attached securely onto the surface of the screen, and the whole assembly exposed to strong light – times vary from 3 minutes to a half an hour in bright sunlight – hardening the exposed colloid. When the positive is removed, the unexposed mixture on the screen can be washed off with warm water, leaving the hardened mixture intact, acting as a precise mask of the desired pattern, which can then be printed with the usual screen-printing process.

Analytical reagent
Because it is non-hygroscopic, potassium dichromate is a common reagent in classical "wet tests" in analytical chemistry.

Ethanol determination

The concentration of ethanol in a sample can be determined by back titration with acidified potassium dichromate. Reacting the sample with an excess of potassium dichromate, all ethanol is oxidized to acetic acid:

 CH3CH2OH + 2[O] → CH3COOH + H2O

Full reaction of converting ethanol to acetic acid:

 3 C2H5OH + 2 K2Cr2O7 + 8 H2SO4 → 3 CH3COOH + 2 Cr2(SO4)3 + 2 K2SO4 + 11 H2O

The excess dichromate is determined by titration against sodium thiosulfate. Adding the amount of excess dichromate from the initial amount, gives the amount of ethanol present. Accuracy can be improved by calibrating the dichromate solution against a blank.

One major application for this reaction is in old police breathalyzer tests. When alcohol vapor makes contact with the orange dichromate-coated crystals, the color changes from Cr(VI) orange to Cr(III) green. The degree of the color change is directly related to the level of alcohol in the suspect's breath.

Silver test
When dissolved in an approximately 35% nitric acid solution it is called Schwerter's solution and is used to test for the presence of various metals, notably for determination of silver purity. Pure silver will turn the solution bright red, sterling silver will turn it dark red, low grade coin silver (0.800 fine) will turn brown (largely due to the presence of copper which turns the solution brown) and even green for 0.500 silver.
Brass turns dark brown, copper turns brown, lead and tin both turn yellow while gold and palladium do not change.

Sulfur dioxide test
Potassium dichromate paper can be used to test for sulfur dioxide, as it turns distinctively from orange to green. This is typical of all redox reactions where hexavalent chromium is reduced to trivalent chromium. Therefore, it is not a conclusive test for sulfur dioxide. The final product formed is Cr2(SO4)3.

SO2 + K2Cr2O7 + 3H2SO4 -> K2SO4 + Cr2(SO4)3 + 3H2O

Wood treatment
Potassium dichromate is used to stain certain types of wood by darkening the tannins in the wood. It produces deep, rich browns that cannot be achieved with modern color dyes. It is a particularly effective treatment on mahogany.

Natural occurrence

Potassium dichromate occurs naturally as the rare mineral lopezite. It has only been reported as vug fillings in the nitrate deposits of the Atacama desert of Chile and in the Bushveld igneous complex of South Africa.

Safety

In 2005–06, potassium dichromate was the 11th-most-prevalent allergen in patch tests (4.8%).

Potassium dichromate is one of the most common causes of chromium dermatitis; chromium is highly likely to induce sensitization leading to dermatitis, especially of the hand and fore-arms, which is chronic and difficult to treat. Toxicological studies have further illustrated its highly toxic nature. With rabbits and rodents, concentrations as low as 14 mg/kg have shown a 50% fatality rate amongst test groups.  Aquatic organisms are especially vulnerable if exposed, and hence responsible disposal according to the local environmental regulations is advised.

As with other Cr(VI) compounds, potassium dichromate is carcinogenic. The compound is also corrosive and exposure may produce severe eye damage or blindness. Human exposure further encompasses impaired fertility, heritable

References

External links

 Potassium Dichromate at The Periodic Table of Videos (University of Nottingham)
 International Chemical Safety Card 1371
 National Pollutant Inventory – Chromium VI and compounds fact sheet
 NIOSH Pocket Guide to Chemical Hazards
 IARC Monograph "Chromium and Chromium compounds"
 Gold refining article listing color change when testing metals with Schwerter's Solution

Potassium compounds
Dichromates
Photographic chemicals
IARC Group 1 carcinogens
Light-sensitive chemicals
Oxidizing agents